Chit ( or Cit) is a Sanskrit word meaning consciousness. It is a core principle in all ancient spiritual traditions originating from the Indian subcontinent, including Hinduism, Sikhism and Jainism.

Hinduism

In Upanishads it is referred to as the Drshta or the Seer, and the sense that makes all other sense experiences possible. Chit is one of three aspects forming the satcitananda nature of the Absolute, according to the Vedic scriptures.

See also
 Satcitananda
 Citta
 Siddhar

References

Further reading

External links
 Arthur Avalon, Shakti and Shâkta. Chapter 14: Cit-Shakti (The Consciousness Aspect of the Universe)

Sanskrit words and phrases